= Vazhappally Padinjaru =

- village
- Location in Kerala, India Vazhappally Padinjaru (India)
- Coordinates: 9.4735000°N 76.5487100°E
- Country: India
- State: Kerala
- District: Kottayam

Government
  - Type: Panchayati raj (India)
  - Body: Gram panchayat

Population (2011)
  - Total: 10,655

Languages
  - Official: Malayalam, English
- Time zone: UTC+5:30 (IST)
- Vehicle registration: KL-33

Vazhappally Padinjaru is a village in Kottayam district in the state of Kerala, India.

== Demographics ==
As of 2011 India census, Vazhappally Padinjaru had a population of 10655 with 5173 males and 5482 females.
